MacDonald Point is a coastal point with some rocky exposures at the south side of the mouth of Darwin Glacier, Antarctica, where the latter flows into the Ross Ice Shelf. It was mapped by the United States Geological Survey from tellurometer surveys and Navy air photos, 1959–63, and was named by the Advisory Committee on Antarctic Names for journalist James H. MacDonald, who as a member of U.S. Navy Squadron VX-6 worked several seasons at McMurdo Station between 1958 and 1961.

References

Headlands of Antarctica
Hillary Coast